The Sporting News established The Sporting News Most Valuable Player Award in 1929.  The award was given annually to the player judged by TSN baseball experts as being the most valuable in each league. The awards were discontinued in 1946.

Key

Awardees

Multiple Wins
Lou Gehrig and Jimmie Fox have won the award three times.  Every player that won the award more than once are members of the National Baseball Hall of Fame and Museum

See also
Sporting News Player of the Year Award
TSN Pitcher of the Year
TSN Rookie of the Year
TSN Reliever of the Year
TSN Comeback Player of the Year
TSN Manager of the Year
TSN Executive of the Year

External links and references
Baseball-Almanac.com

References

Major League Baseball trophies and awards
Baseball most valuable player awards
Most valuable player awards
Awards established in 1929
Awards disestablished in 1946
1929 establishments in Missouri